Aatpadi Nights is a 2019 Indian Marathi language romantic comedy film directed by Nitin SinduVijay Supekar and produced by the banner of Maaydesh Media. This film presenting by Subodh Bhave & Maaydesh Media. The film starring Subodh Bhave, Pranav Raorane and Sayali Sanjeev follows the story of excitement, nervousness and the ignorance of the first night of marriage.

The film teaser released on 6 December 2019, The film was released theatrically on 27 December 2019.

Cast 

Pranav Raorane
Sayali Sanjeev
Chaya Kadam
Sanjay Kulakarni
Aarti Wadabgalkar
Sameer Khandekar
Jatin Inamdar
Yogesh Iratkar
Om Thakur (Child actor)

Special Appearance 

 Subodh Bhave
 Vivek Rajesh
 Dr. Sudhir Nikam

Production 
The film was publicly announced on 2 December 2019, with intensity building official poster of movie with just a closed door with sign of "Do No Disturb" on it and the film title. The film to be directed by Nitin SinduVijay Supekar and produced by Maaydesh Media.

Soundtrack 
The songs for the film are composed by Vijay Gavande & Sidharth Dhukate and lyrics by Narayan Puri and sung by Adarsh Shinde, Vaishali Mhade and Sanghapal Tayade.

References 

 'Aatpadi Nights': Subodh Bhave unveils the first look poster of his next The Times of India, Retrieved 2 December 2019.
मराठी सिनेसृष्टीत सायलीच्या चित्रपटांची चर्चा Maharashtra Times, Retrieved 29 November 2019.
 सुबोध भावे आता नव्या भूमिकेत, जाणून घ्या Peeing Moon, Retrieved 1 December 2019.
 आटपाडी नाईट्स साठी सुबोध भावे बनला प्रस्तुतकर्ता Danik Prabhat, Retrieved 30 November 2019. 
सुबोध भावे आता पुन्हा एकदा नव्या इनिंग साठी सज्ज… Maharashtra Desha,  Retrieved 5 December 2019.
Aatpadi Nights Poster Release: Subodh Bhave Unveils The First Look For His Next Film Spotbyoe, Retrieved 3 December 2019.
‘आटपाडी नाईट्स’ साठी सुबोध भावे बनला प्रस्तुतकर्ता Pune Prahar, Retrieved 3 December 2019.
सुबोध भावे घेऊन येतोय ‘आटपाडी नाईट्स’ Rashtramat, Retrieved 2 December 2019.
प्रस्तुतकर्ता म्हणून सुबोध भावे करणार नवी सुरुवात. Marathi Box office, Retrieved 2 December 2019.
पाहा Video : ‘आटपाडी नाईट्स’चा भन्नाट ट्रेलर Peeing Moon, Retrieved 19 December 2019.

External links 
 

2019 films
Indian romantic comedy films
2010s Marathi-language films